James Endicott may refer to:

James Endicott (cleric, born 1865) (1865–1954), Canadian Methodist minister and missionary and Moderator of the United Church of Canada
James Gareth Endicott (1898–1993), Canadian Methodist minister, missionary to China, and outspoken supporter of the Chinese Communist Party
James Bridges Endicott (1814–1870), American sea captain, opium trader, and merchant in Hong Kong, protector of Ng Akew